Atrocitus (Atros) is a supervillain appearing in American comic books published by DC Comics. Atrocitus is an enemy to the Guardians of the Universe and Sinestro, their former Green Lantern. He is the leader of the Red Lantern Corps.

Publication history
Atrocitus first appears in Green Lantern vol. 4 #25 in a two-page "War of Light" spread and was created by Geoff Johns and Ethan Van Sciver.

Fictional character biography

Green Lantern: Secret Origin
When the rogue Manhunters rampaged through Space Sector 666, Atros was one of only five beings in the entire sector to escape death, having been forced to witness his own wife and daughters killed by one of the rampaging robots. Renaming himself "Atrocitus", he and the other four survivors formed a terrorist cabal known as the Five Inversions, bent on the destruction of the Guardians of the Universe and all who served them, with Atrocitus serving as their leader. The Five Inversions performed a ritual which allowed them to peer into the future and discover the prophecy of the Blackest Night, which decreed that all life in the universe would end. Forming an "Empire of Tears", the Inversions attempted to destroy the Guardians, but were defeated and imprisoned on the planet Ysmault.

Some time later, Abin Sur began making periodic visits to Ysmault, and began to ask questions regarding the Blackest Night. Sur even went so far as to free Atrocitus from his imprisonment so that he could lead the Green Lantern to Earth, the prophesied birthplace of "the black" that would one day end the universe. Taken to Earth by starship (due to fellow Inversion Qull predicting that Sur's ring would one day fail him when he most needed it) and bound by energy restraints created by Sur's ring, Atrocitus instilled fear in his captor, allowing the yellow impurity to seep into his willpower constructs and weaken them enough to allow him to break free. After slashing the Green Lantern in the chest, mortally wounding him, Atrocitus jumped from a point high in Earth's atmosphere to escape Sur's failing ship.

Encounter with William Hand
After landing near an airbase, and killing an unspecified number of Air Force troopers, Atrocitus recited what would later become the oath of the Red Lantern Corps, and performed a ritual that told him the name of the herald of the Blackest Night: William Hand. Atrocitus created a device using stolen gun parts that acted as a cosmic divining rod, and used it to lead him to Hand. Once he tracked down the human who, it was said, would play a prominent role in the coming of the Blackest Night, he attacked, and planned to take Hand's innards back to Ysmault. Before his plan proceeded, however, Sinestro and rookie Green Lantern Hal Jordan intercepted him, spiriting William Hand to safety. Atrocitus used his newly constructed device to sap the power from their rings, leaving them with only their wits to defend them from the master of the Five Inversions. Sinestro was able to restore their rings' powers through his power battery, but Atrocitus still had the upper hand. Just as he was about to crush Sinestro with a power shovel, Jordan used his ring to blow up the yellow vehicle, which surprised Atrocitus greatly, as he believed Green Lantern rings did not work on anything colored yellow. Defeated, Atrocitus was contained by Sinestro, and brought to Oa. He was later returned to Ysmault by Sinestro, where he prophesied that Sinestro's home planet Korugar would soon erupt into chaos and disorder. Through this act, it was implied that it was Atrocitus who planted the seeds of Sinestro's later fall from grace.

Rage of the Red Lanterns

In the aftermath of the Sinestro Corps War, Atrocitus was seen forging a Red Lantern power battery, utilizing the power of rage. He said that his first new victim would be the one who called himself "the greatest Green Lantern": Sinestro, who had long since abandoned the Green Lantern Corps to forge a Corps in his own namesake. He also murdered Qull of the Five Inversions, a fellow member of the Empire of Tears and the one responsible for telling Abin Sur the prophecy of the Blackest Night (which caused the Guardians of the Universe to continue the Empire of Tears' incarceration on Ysmault, rather than transfer them to Oa's sciencells, closer to the enemies of the Five Inversions), by bludgeoning him with the power battery. In this way, the first power battery was christened with blood.

Atrocitus murdered the other members of the Five Inversions, using their blood to create red power rings, power batteries, and a Red Central Power Battery on Ysmault. Atrocitus soon donned his new red power ring, becoming the first Red Lantern. He recruited many other individuals from across the universe who possessed great anger and hate, including former Green Lantern Laira. Many of them had been wronged by the Sinestro Corps, and Atrocitus promises them that the Red Lantern Corps will eradicate Sinestro himself. He led his new corps in an assault against Sinestro while he was being transferred by some members of the Green Lantern Corps from the Oan Sciencells to his home planet of Korugar for execution.

The Red Lanterns interrupted a deadly fight between Sinestro's forces and the Green Lanterns, killing members of both sides without discrimination. Atrocitus personally slew the long-standing Green Lantern Remnant Nod. Eventually Sinestro was captured and taken to Ysmault for execution, and Hal Jordan, who had faced Atrocitus before, was left for dead in space. After bringing Sinestro to Ysmault, Atrocitus nailed the former Green Lantern to a cross to await his execution at his own hands. However, unlike the Guardians, who preferred a quick execution, Atrocitus wished to make Sinestro suffer first by taking revenge on everything he has ever cared about. His targets included Korugar, and Sinestro's previously unknown and hidden daughter, whose identity Atrocitus had learned through his blood prophecies.

When Hal Jordan and the Blue Lanterns arrived to recover Sinestro, Atrocitus revealed another prophecy to Jordan: that the Guardians will one day take his greatest love, and he will become a renegade once again because of their actions. Although Sinestro believes that Atrocitus' prophecy could be a form of reverse psychology to instill fear in Jordan of his past actions under the influence of Parallax. After rescuing Sinestro, the Blue Lanterns began to leave, but Jordan wanted to go back for Laira, whom Sinestro killed to save Jordan. In a burst of outrage, Jordan prepared to carry out Sinestro's death sentence himself, against the wishes of the Blue Lanterns. The rage that Jordan felt drew Laira's red ring to him, converting Jordan into the newest member of the Red Lantern Corps. Jordan attacked the Blue Lanterns and Sinestro, until Saint Walker managed to get a Blue power ring onto his finger. The blue ring negated the effects of the red ring, restoring Jordan to normal. Jordan then attacked Atrocitus, using the power of the blue and green rings to make the red one explode in his face. Defeated, the Red Lanterns retreated to the dark side of Ysmault, where Atrocitus performed another blood ritual, seeking to discover the location of the Blue Lanterns' homeworld.

Blackest Night

During the Blackest Night limited series the Lost Lanterns came to Ysmault to retrieve Laira's body, but were opposed by Atrocitus and the Red Lanterns. During the conflict, several black power rings descended onto Ysmault, reanimating the bodies of Laira and Atrocitus' fellow Inversions. The reanimated Qull ripped out Atrocitus' heart; However, because Red Lantern rings effectively replace their wearer's hearts, the attack did not kill Atrocitus.

Atrocitus later appeared on Okaara to steal Larfleeze's power battery. However, Hal Jordan, Carol Ferris, Sinestro, Saint Walker, Ganthet, Sayd, and Indigo-1, save the two from Black Lanterns and stop Atrocitus. He was then brought back to Ryut, where his rage subsided into grief for his lost world. He agreed to help in the fight against the Black Lanterns, but promised to kill the Guardians when the conflict was over. Following the Black Lantern central power battery to Earth, the Corps leaders combined their lights to form the white light of creation, which, despite Indigo-1's claims, failed to destroy the battery, instead making the force behind it stronger. Ganthet then duplicated the leader's rings, in an attempt to bolster their forces. The duplicate of Atrocitus' ring found its way to Mera, temporarily inducting her into the Red Lantern Corps. When the Corps leaders and their deputies were being attacked by a Black Lantern Spectre, Atrocitus senses the spirit's true nature despite being influenced by the black ring; an embodiment of rage and vengeance. Atrocitus desires to harness the Spectre's powers for his vendettas against the Guardians after the spirit is free from the Black Lantern Corps. When Parallax frees the Spectre, Atrocitus attempts to convert him into his own rage entity, but fails, the Spectre warning him that the true rage entity is not to be trifled with.

Brightest Day

Following the defeat of the Black Lanterns, Atrocitus returns to Ysmault, and is soon after approached by Ganthet and Guy Gardner, who ask him to join them in an as-yet unidentified mission. Despite his utter hatred for the Guardians, Atrocitus agrees, sending the Red Lantern Bleez to assist Guy.

Sometime later, he appeared in New York City with the feline Red Lantern Corps member, Dex-Starr in search of the emotional spectrum entities. They killed several criminals in the subway, while sparing the remaining riders in the subway car. When he performed his blood ritual, it revealed to him the location of the entities except for Ion and Parallax. Hal, Carol and Sinestro confronted Atrocitus for his murderous actions as he finished the ritual; however, Atrocitus justified them by claiming they did what they did to protect innocents. Carol confirmed Atrocitus' sincerity by detecting a spark of love in his heart with her powers that was not there during their previous encounter, only to have her words ignite his anger. Enraged, Atrocitus blasts the trio out of the subway, and engages in combat. During the brawl, it is revealed that Atrocitus has learned how to create constructs with his powers. Their fight is then interrupted as Lobo makes an appearance, incapacitating Hal. The Lanterns join together to fight off Lobo, with Atrocitus revealing that he is on Earth to stop the being who is capturing the Emotional entities. It is later revealed that Atrocitus had hired Lobo to attack him to gain the others trust. During his search for the Rage Entity, known as the Butcher, Atrocitus incinerates a prison bus full of murderers, claiming that "Those who take life do not deserve it."

Atrocitus locates the Butcher, who is about to possess a man whose daughter had been killed by a death row inmate. Despite the Spectre's attempts to stop it, the Butcher succeeds, killing the criminal. The Butcher then attempts to possess Atrocitus, revealing that Atrocitus had a wife and children who were killed in the Manhunters' attack. With the Spectre's help, Atrocitus wards off the Butcher and imprisons it within his power battery. The Spectre attempts to judge the man that the Butcher possessed, but Atrocitus argues that his method of judgment is flawed. The Spectre calls off his judgment, and is unable to judge Atrocitus, discovering that his mission is a "holy" one.

He returns to Jordan and the other New Guardians just as a robed figure gained the upper hand in their fight. Catching him off guard with a burst of his napalm-acidic blood, Atrocitus vented his long suppressed rage against the Guardians upon Krona, knowing of his Maltus origins and how he was once connected to the Guardians of the Universe. Without the rage entity to control Atrocitus' powers, Krona fell victim to his attack as the Red Lantern viciously bites him in the jugular. Using the Ion entity to counterattack, Krona used Ophidian to disrupt the New Guardians from fighting back (including Atrocitus). Learning that Atrocitus had trapped the Butcher inside of his lantern, Krona exorcized the rage entity from its prison, and made him his own. Atrocitus and the New Guardians were utterly defeated, and once again stuck together to find Krona using Larfleeze to track down the avarice entity.

War of the Green Lanterns
Atrocitus and the rest of the New Guardians make their way to Ryut, where Larfleeze has detected Ophidian. Krona and the entities are nowhere to be found but the group does come upon the Book of the Black. Inside they discover that it was Krona who purposefully reprogrammed the Manhunters to wipe out all life in Sector 666. Atrocitus reveals that he already knew this. Former Sinestro Corps member Lyssa Drak appears and quickly subdues the New Guardians trapping all but Hal in the Book of the Black.

When Hal meets up with Guy Gardner at the "Green House", Guy reveals the pact made between him, Ganthet, and Atrocitus. It is revealed that part of the pact was that once Krona had been defeated he would be turned over to Atrocitus to face justice. Hal told Guy that this most likely means executing Krona. In the final battle, Atrocitus is freed from the book by Kyle Rayner, and his red ring returns to him. Although outraged at losing the chance to kill Krona due to Hal Jordan, Atrocitus is unable to vent his fury, as the Guardians of the Universe teleport him back home. Afterwards, Atrocitus was confronted by Ganthet, who brings Krona's corpse to him to do what he wishes.

Red Lanterns
Following his return to Ysmault, Atrocitus feels his rage dimming, and fears that he may lose control over the Red Lantern hordes. Using Krona's innards to perform a blood ritual, Atrocitus sees many acts of evil across the universe. He resolves to lead his Red Lanterns in punishing the guilty. However, feeling his control over the rampaging, animalistic Red Lanterns dimming, he also decides to uplift one of them to be his equal and helper. He settles for Bleez, restoring her mind and naming her his new right-hand. It is later revealed that he has kept Krona's corpse as a 'confidant', talking to the body when he needs to give voice to his feelings about the Red Lantern Corps and his plans to upgrade their intelligence. However, after granting intellects to three additional Red Lanterns to act as a check to Bleez, Atrocitus returns to the place where he has left Krona's body only to find it gone. Although Atrocitus attempts to find Krona's body, he is left to consider both the worrying possibility that Krona has come back to life and, when faced with a revolt from Bleez, Atrocitus starts to wonder if the loss of Krona's body has robbed him of the focus of his rage, as he has begun to try and justify his actions where he used to consider his mere identity enough of a justification. He briefly regains his focus and unbridled rage when he discovers how Krona did not resurrect: instead Abysmus, one of his early experiments at creating life by the use of necromancy and shamanic rituals, had stolen Krona's body, eaten and flayed him and used his skin to empower himself and similar demonic creatures, known as the Abysmorphs. Abysmus and the Abysmorphs manage to overpower Atrocitus, wounding him grievously, causing Atrocitus to summon John Moore, the new backup Red Lantern of the sector 2814.

Learning that Kyle is attempting to acquire the power of the seven Corps, Atrocitus agrees to train Kyle to harness the red ring of rage to use that power against the Guardians. He attempts to provoke Kyle's rage by reminding him of the death of his girlfriend Alex after he got the ring, but when this fails (Kyle instead feels grief rather than anger), he takes Kyle to witness a group of people being threatened and executed in another country, Kyle's anger at this provoking the activation of the red power within him.

During a confrontation with the First Lantern, Atrocitus is shown a world where the massacre of Sector 666 never took place, but witnesses a life where he became a brutal dictator after overthrowing his world's government, even killing his wife before he is finally killed by his own son. Horrified at this vision, Atroctius rejects the First Lantern's 'offer' to make that world the reality, believing that even the loss of his entire sector is better than being killed by his own son. Although he briefly orders the other Red Lanterns to kill him as he blames himself for the massacre, Atrocitus later decides to use this experience to reconnect with the rage that drives his Corps, and leads them in the final assault against the First Lantern, which culminates in him killing one of the last Guardians of the Universe after a Parallax-possessed Sinestro kills the others.

In the aftermath of Wrath of The First Lantern, Atrocitus loses his ring to Guy Gardner, who has been recruited by Hal Jordan as a mole, and has his severely beaten body to be carried away by Dex-Starr. After drifting in space for a while, he manages to merge with the Butcher, the red light living embodiment of rage which he then loses to Kyle Rayner during the fight against Relic. Atrocitus and Dex-Starr then find another feral Red Lantern, kill it and take its ring. He then captures Rankorr and forces a bug inside him to make him feral. He then poisons the blood on Ysmult and using a second lake on Styge Prime he creates hundreds of rings and sends them to Earth. He then uses these new formed reds from Earth to fight Guy Gardner, but Gardner bears him by proving his rage greater than Atrocitus' and takes away his ring along with Dex-Starr's and all the new formed red's as well. Although it is presumed he is dead, Gardner still refers to him as alive.

DC Rebirth
In DC Rebirth, Atrocitus resumes his reign over the Red Lanterns. He begins by enacting the prophecy of the Red Dawn on Earth. To do this, he began infecting humanity with rage and constructed a Hell Tower.

Powers and abilities
Atrocitus wields a Red Lantern power ring similar to that of a Green Lantern's, except it is powered by rage rather than willpower. The full extent of a red power ring's powers has not been revealed, but it is stated in Final Crisis: Rage of the Red Lanterns that the red ring acts as their heart and pumps their rage-tainted blood out of their body through their mouth. While initially unable to do so, Atrocitus learned to create red light constructs after observing the other lanterns during the Blackest Night. It is also shown that the ring's red energy corrupts the auras of other power rings and burns them away, possibly corrupting the ring beyond the ability of a Lantern to use. Unlike the other members of the Red Lantern Corps, whose rings reduce them to being mindless raging beasts, leaving them unable to create and maintain energy constructs as do Green and Blue Lanterns, Atrocitus is in full control of his mental faculties while wearing his ring and may not be affected in the same manner. However, the Red Lantern's corruptive energy can be overcome and purified by the Blue Lantern's energies. Atrocitus can deliberately override the corruptive influence of the red energy on his followers by using his magic, but never chooses to do so.

Atrocitus possesses superhuman strength and durability; strong enough to toss a 14+ ton construction digger and durable enough to withstand knife attacks.

Atrocitus' association with the Empire of Tears granted him a great deal of shamanistic magic, which he used to forge the Red Lantern rings and divine the location of William Hand.

Atrocitus is highly intelligent, able to construct the energy-draining device later used by Black Hand from simple gun and computer parts. Before the Manhunters destroyed sector 666, Atrocitus was a psychologist.

Other versions

Flashpoint
In the alternate timeline of the "Flashpoint" storyline, dialogue states that Atrocitus, though still a Red Lantern, succeeded in killing William Hand, unleashing Nekron and the Black Lanterns. For this, Atrocitus was captured and crucified on planet Ysmault. Atrocitus is later visited by Sinestro (still a Green Lantern in this timeline), who had hoped to understand the meaning of the "Flashpoint". Atrocitus tells the "Flashpoint" prophecy is a moment when all of history will be changed and the "Flash" who changed history and use his power to reset the universe to what he believes it should be. Sinestro killed him after what Atrocitus told him.

In other media

Television
 Atrocitus appears in Green Lantern: The Animated Series, voiced by Jonathan Adams. This version, in his pursuit of revenge against the Guardians of the Universe for the Manhunters' massacre of Space Sector 666, creates special planet-killing explosive devices called "Liberators" to destroy entire planets and "liberate" them from the Guardians, and additionally manipulated Razer into eventually becoming his successor. Atrocitus is eventually defeated by Hal Jordan, but Aya turns the former into her "champion of hate" in exchange for killing Carol Ferris, only to be defeated by her and Jordan via her Star Sapphire ring.
 Atrocitus appears in Justice League Action, voiced by Michael Dorn.
 Atrocitus makes a cameo appearance in the DC Super Hero Girls episode, "#RageCat".

Film
 Atrocitus appears in a flashback in Green Lantern: Emerald Knights, voiced by Bruce Thomas. He fought Abin Sur, attempting to use the Green Lantern's power battery as a bomb, but is defeated. As Abin Sur took him to prison, Atrocitus warned him of his impending death and of a dire prophecy in which Sinestro betrays the Green Lantern Corps, discovers the yellow element, and forms the Sinestro Corps.
 Atrocitus appears in Lego DC Comics Super Heroes: Aquaman: Rage of Atlantis, voiced again by Jonathan Adams.

Video games
 Atrocitus appears as unlockable "Legends PVP" character in DC Universe Online as part of the "War of the Light Part 1" DLC.
 Atrocitus appears as a playable character in Lego Batman 3: Beyond Gotham, voiced by Ike Amadi.
 Atrocitus appears as a playable character in Infinite Crisis, voiced again by Ike Amadi.
 Atrocitus appears as a playable character in Injustice 2, voiced again by Ike Amadi. He is assisted by Dex-Starr during gameplay. In his arcade ending, he defeats Brainiac, only to learn he unintentionally destroyed every city the latter had collected and enhance the Red Lantern Corps' power to an uncontrollable level. Atrocitus is attacked by his fellow Red Lanterns, but is saved by the compassion entity, Proselyte. Coming to the realization that balance is necessary to uphold justice, Atrocitus creates a united Lantern army to punish the guilty and offer mercy to those who deserve it.
 Atrocitus appears as a playable character in Lego DC Super-Villains, voiced again by Ike Amadi.

References

Comics characters introduced in 2007
DC Comics aliens
DC Comics demons
Villains in animated television series
DC Comics characters who can teleport 
DC Comics characters who use magic
DC Comics characters with superhuman strength
DC Comics extraterrestrial supervillains 
DC Comics characters who have mental powers
DC Comics telepaths
Fictional empaths
Fictional shamans
Fictional warlords 
Fictional characters with absorption or parasitic abilities
Fictional characters with precognition
Fictional characters with energy-manipulation abilities 
Fictional characters who can manipulate light
Fighting game characters
Characters created by Geoff Johns
Characters created by Ethan Van Sciver
Vigilante characters in comics
Video game bosses
Green Lantern characters